Matthew Peter Miller (born July 30, 1956) is a former American football offensive tackle who played four seasons with the Cleveland Browns of the National Football League. He was drafted by the Cleveland Browns in the fourth round of the 1979 NFL Draft, making him a member of the Kardiac Kids. Miller played college football at the University of Colorado Boulder and was on the 1978 College Football All-America Team. He attended Durango High School in Durango, Colorado. Miller also played two seasons for the Denver Gold in the United States Football League. He is now a professor in Mechanical and Aerospace Engineering at Cornell University. He is featured in several articles with daughter Chaney Miller, who graduated from Cornell University in 2014 with a degree in civil engineering. Miller also currently serves as the Associate Director of Cornell High Energy Synchrotron Source (CHESS).

References

Living people
1956 births
Players of American football from Colorado
American football offensive tackles
Colorado Buffaloes football players
Cleveland Browns players
Denver Gold players
People from Durango, Colorado
Cornell University faculty